Váljohka is a village in Karasjok Municipality in Troms og Finnmark county, Norway.  The village is located at the confluence of the rivers Váljohka and Tana.  The village lies right along the Norway-Finland border in the eastern part of the municipality.  The European route E06 highway runs through the village.  Valjok Church is located in a forested area near the center of the village.

References

Villages in Finnmark
Karasjok
Populated places of Arctic Norway